During the 1996–97 English football season, Wigan Athletic F.C. competed in the Football League Third Division.

Season summary
In the 1996–97 season, Wigan Athletic became Third Division champions on the last day of the campaign, Graeme Jones scoring a club record 31 league goals in the process. In most seasons they would have been runners-up, but a temporary rule change which saw goals scored take precedence over goal difference allowed them to finish above runners-up Fulham, who had the same number of points and a better goal difference.

Final league table

 Pld = Matches ; W = Matches won; D = Matches drawn; L = Matches lost; F = Goals for; A = Goals against; GD = Goal difference; Pts = Points
 NB: In the Football League goals scored (F) takes precedence over goal difference (GD).

Results
Wigan Athletic's score comes first

Legend

Football League Third Division

FA Cup

League Cup

Football League Trophy

Squad
Note: Numbers in brackets are appearances as a substitute.
Source:

References

Wigan Athletic F.C. seasons
Wigan Athletic